Peter "Stretch" Shiels (born 4 September 1973 in Bankstown, New South Wales), is an Australian former rugby league footballer who played in the 1990s and 2000s.

As Super League V champions, St. Helens played against 2000 NRL Premiers, the Brisbane Broncos in the 2001 World Club Challenge. Shiels played for St. Helens from the interchange bench in their 2002 Super League Grand Final victory against the Bradford Bulls.

Personal life
Shiels is married to Linda (née Alexander), the sister of fellow former rugby league footballers, Ben Alexander and Greg Alexander.

Shiels now resides in Newcastle, New South Wales, where he works as a real estate agent. Shiels got his start in real estate with a local agency, and in 2020 he opted to create his own brand - Shiels+Co Property. The office is located in Whitebridge; and one of his employees is his eldest daughter, Ruby.

References

External links
Saints Heritage Society profile

1973 births
Living people
Australian rugby league players
Newcastle Knights players
Penrith Panthers players
Rugby league players from Sydney
Rugby league props
Rugby league second-rows
St Helens R.F.C. players
Western Reds players
Western Suburbs Magpies players